The  was a Limited express train service in Japan operated by the East Japan Railway Company (JR East) between  and  on the Shinetsu Main Line in Niigata Prefecture between March 1997 and 2002.

Rolling stock
Services were formed of Niigata-based 4- and 6-car 485 series EMUs.

History
The Minori services commenced from the start of the revised timetable on 22 March 1997, with one working in each direction daily.

Services to and from Nagano were subsequently cut back due to poor loadings, reduced to two workings in each direction daily between Niigata and Takada from 1 December 2001.

See also
 List of named passenger trains of Japan

References

Named passenger trains of Japan
East Japan Railway Company
Rail transport in Niigata Prefecture
Railway services introduced in 1997
Railway services discontinued in 2002
1997 establishments in Japan
2002 disestablishments in Japan

ja:くびき野 (列車)